John Bowie (died 1815 CE) was a musician and music publisher based in Perth, Scotland. Per the 1900 reference work British music publishers, printers and engravers: London, provincial, Scottish, and Irish: From Queen Elizabeth's reign to George the Fourth's, with select bibliographical lists of musical works printed and published within that period:

References

Year of birth unknown
1815 deaths
People from Perth, Scotland
18th-century Scottish musicians
British music publishers (people)